Casper Sleep (also known as Casper) is an e-commerce company that sells sleep products online and in retail locations. Headquartered in New York City, the company has showrooms in New York City, Chicago, and elsewhere. Its mattresses are manufactured in Georgia and Pennsylvania.

History
Casper was launched in April 2014 by Philip Krim (previously of The Merrick Group, angelbeds.com, tranquilitymattress.com and SleepBetterStore.com), Neil Parikh, T. Luke Sherwin, Jeff Chapin (previously of IDEO), and Gabriel Flateman.

In January 2014, the company raised $1.85 million in its first round of funding. The round was led by Lerer Ventures and Norwest Ventures and also included funding from Crosslink Partners, Vaizra Investments, and Correlation Ventures.

On April 22, 2014, Casper officially launched In August 2014, an additional $13.1 million was received in Series A funding, including investments from New Enterprise Associates, Ron Conway’s SV Angel, Ashton Kutcher's firm, A-Grade Investments, fashion designer Steven Alan, Queensbridge Venture Partners, and the investment group of musical artist Nas.

In November 2014, Casper expanded its delivery from the contiguous United States to include Canada.

Led by Institutional Venture Partners, the company raised $55 million Series B venture funding in June 2015. The Series B funding included participation from celebrity investors: Tobey Maguire, Leonardo DiCaprio, Scooter Braun, Adam Levine, and Pritzker Group Venture Capital.

Led by Target Corporation, the company raised $170 million in Series C funding in June 2017. The Series C funding included participation from Tresalia, Institutional Venture Partners, Norwest Venture Partners, Lerer Hippeau Ventures, New Enterprise Associates, and Irving Investors. In September 2017, Casper collaborated with American Airlines to provide a full suite of sleep products.

In April 2018, Casper Sleep partnered with American Airlines to design pillows, blankets and other products for the airline's passengers. Casper also announced later in April that they would be opening up a Canadian office in Toronto, along with a manufacturing facility in the country.

In early 2019, Casper Sleep received a $100 million Series D funding from its existing investors Target, NEA, IVP, and Norwest Venture Partners, as well as new sponsors Dani Reiss of the Canada Goose Holdings and Gordon Segal of Crate & Barrel. Dani Reiss also entered the startup's new independent board directors along with Karen Katz (board member of Under Armour and former CEO of Neiman Marcus Group). With the new round of funding, the company was valued at $1.1 billion, according to Bloomberg and Casper Sleep.

On January 10, 2020, Casper Sleep Inc filed an S-1 with the U.S. Securities and Exchange Commission declaring their intention to IPO under the ticker CSPR.

On February 6, 2020, it went public at $12 per share, translating to a market value of $476 million, listing on New York Stock Exchange under the ticker CSPR. On March 31, 2020, its stock dropped to $4.12 per share, translating to a market value of $163 million, down from its $1.1 billion valuation in March, 2019.

In April 2020, Casper announced the winding down of its European operations and laid off 21% of its staff (78 people) after a poor IPO performance and declining revenues due to the COVID-19 pandemic. Additionally, the company announced that Greg Macfarlane, Casper’s CFO and COO, would depart the company in May.

In November 2021, Casper announced that it had entered into a definitive agreement to be acquired by Durational Capital Management. The transaction completed in January 2022 and Casper's stock was delisted from the New York Stock Exchange.

Casper published Van Winkle's, a news website focusing on sleep until November 2018. After the shutdown of Van Winkle's, Casper announced a quarterly lifestyle magazine, Woolly.

Retail presence 

In June 2016, Casper began selling their mattresses at West Elm stores in the United States and Canada. However, the partnership ended in October 2017, with Leesa replacing Casper.

In January 2018, Casper opened temporary nap pods inside of seven Indigo Books and Music locations in Canada. In February 2018, Casper's first permanent store opened in New York City. In April 2018, Casper announced that they would be opening stores in four Canadian provinces over twelve months, beginning with two Toronto locations in spring 2018. In June, they announced a partnership with the Hudson's Bay Company to begin selling Casper products at 16 Hudson's Bay stores, 26 Home Outfitters stores and thebay.com in Canada.

In July 2018, Casper announced the launch of the Dreamery, a “physical sleep experience” that will let city dwellers book 45 minutes of downtime in one of its nine private rooms. The concept store was located just behind its Manhattan flagship in Greenwich Village. On July 13, 2018, Casper announced they are now available to try and purchase at Nordstrom.

Controversies

In April 2016, Casper sued three mattress review websites which had written negative reviews of Casper products. According to the lawsuits, the websites steered potential customers of Casper products to competing mattress companies, which Casper claimed is a deceptive advertising practice. The lawsuit against one of the review websites, Sleepopolis, was resolved after Casper financed its acquisition.

See also
Warby Parker
Away
Outdoor Voices
Harry’s

References

External links
 

2014 establishments in New York City
American companies established in 2014
Retail companies established in 2014
Internet properties established in 2014
Online retailers of the United States
Companies formerly listed on the New York Stock Exchange
Privately held companies based in New York City
Retail companies based in New York City
Mattress retailers of the United States
2020 initial public offerings
2022 mergers and acquisitions
Private equity portfolio companies